Juan Peralta Gascon (born 17 May 1990, Pamplona) is a Spanish racing cyclist. He competed in keirin at the 2012 Summer Olympics in London.  At the 2016 Summer Olympics he competed in the men's sprint.

References

1990 births
Living people
Spanish male cyclists
Cyclists at the 2012 Summer Olympics
Cyclists at the 2016 Summer Olympics
Olympic cyclists of Spain
Sportspeople from Pamplona
Cyclists at the 2019 European Games
European Games competitors for Spain
Cyclists from Navarre